This is a list of records from the National Football League, a Gaelic football competition for county teams in Ireland.

Scoring
David Tubridy of Clare became top scorer in National Football League history against Cork in May 2021.

All-time scoring record
As of 1 June 2021, with those in bold still playing
 David Tubridy 22–412 (478)
 Mickey Kearins 7–448 (469)
 Ronan Carolan 19–387 (444)
 Tony McTague 9–360 (387)
 Mattie Forde 29–299 (386)
 Conor McManus 14–341 (383)
 Steven McDonnell 33–282 (381)
 Brian Stafford 13–334 (373)
 Mick O'Dwyer 19–313 (370)
 Dermot Earley Snr 17–316 (367)

Top scorers for each team

 Antrim: 
 Armagh: Steven McDonnell
 Carlow: 
 Cavan: Ronan Carolan
 Clare: David Tubridy
 Cork: 
 Derry: 
 Donegal: 
 Down: 
 Dublin: 
 Fermanagh: 
 Galway: 
 Kerry: Mick O'Dwyer
 Kildare: 
 Laois: 
 Leitrim: 
 Limerick: 
 London: 
 Longford: 
 Louth: 
 Mayo: 
 Meath: Brian Stafford
 Monaghan: Conor McManus
 Offaly: Tony McTague
 Roscommon: Dermot Earley Snr
 Sligo: Mickey Kearins
 Tipperary: 
 Tyrone: 
 Waterford: 
 Westmeath: 
 Wexford: Mattie Forde
 Wicklow:

References

Gaelic games records and statistics
Records and statistics